Valentina Bizak is a Soviet sprint canoer who competed in the early 1960s. She won two medals at the 1963 ICF Canoe Sprint World Championships with a gold in the K-4 500 m and a bronze in the K-2 500 m events.

References

Living people
Soviet female canoeists
Year of birth missing (living people)
ICF Canoe Sprint World Championships medalists in kayak